Thomas Meehan is the name of:

Thomas Meehan (botanist) (1826–1901),  British-born nurseryman, botanist and author
Thomas Meehan (writer) (1929–2017), American playwright
Tommy Meehan (1896–1924), England international footballer
Tom Meehan (footballer, born 1909) (1909–1957), Australian rules footballer for Fitzroy
Tom Meehan (footballer, born 1926) (1926–2018), Australian rules footballer for St Kilda and Fitzroy